Ma Jianzhong (1845 – 1900), courtesy name Meishu, also known as Ma Kié-Tchong in French, was a Chinese official and scholar in the late Qing dynasty.

Ma was born in Dantu, Jiangsu province to a prominent Chinese Catholic family. After studies at a French Catholic school in Shanghai, Ma went to France in 1876 to study international law. He became the first Chinese to obtain a baccalauréat and in 1879 he obtained a diploma in law (licence de droit) from École Libre des Sciences Politiques (known today as Sciences Po) in Paris.

Following his return to China in 1880, Ma became a member of Li Hongzhang's secretariat, where Ma's knowledge of international law became a useful asset. Among other things, Ma helped to carry out Qing policy in Korea in 1880–82 and he took part in the arrest of Taewŏn'gun. In 1884, he also became involved in the China Merchants' Steam Navigation Company, where he worked closely with Tong King-sing.

Ma is the author of Mashi Wentong (馬氏文通 "Basic principles for writing clearly and coherently by Mister Ma"), the first textbook of Chinese grammar written by a Chinese (there were already several grammars written by Westerners), published in 1898. Today most scholars believe that Ma's older brother Ma Xiangbo, a famous educator and co-founder of Fudan University, also contributed to the work.

Ma had been requested by Li Hongzhang, for whom he had previously worked for since 1880s to assist after the Eight-Nation Alliance stormed Beijing as part of the Boxer Rebellion and died on August 4, 1900, in Shanghai.

References

.

Footnotes

External links
 About Ma's study in France (in Chinese)
A Journal to the East (東行錄), Ma's record on Korea (in Chinese)
Alain Peyraube, "Some Reflections on the Sources of the Mashi Wentong"

1845 births
1900 deaths
Grammarians from China
Linguists of Chinese
Writers from Zhenjiang
Qing dynasty politicians from Jiangsu
Scientists from Zhenjiang
Politicians from Zhenjiang